Murder at the Inn is a 1934 British crime film directed by George King and starring Wendy Barrie, Harold French and Jane Carr. It was a quota quickie, made at Teddington Studios by the British subsidiary of Warner Brothers.

Cast
 Wendy Barrie as Angela  
 Harold French as Tony 
 Jane Carr as Fifi  
 Davy Burnaby as Colonel Worthing  
 Nicholas Hannen as Dedreet  
 Minnie Rayner as Aunt  
 Harold Saxon-Snell as Inspector

References

Bibliography
 Low, Rachael. Filmmaking in 1930s Britain. George Allen & Unwin, 1985.
 Wood, Linda. British Films, 1927-1939. British Film Institute, 1986.

External links

1934 films
British crime films
1934 crime films
1930s English-language films
Films shot at Teddington Studios
Films set in England
Films directed by George King
Quota quickies
Warner Bros. films
British black-and-white films
1930s British films